Indio viejo ("old Indian") is a type of stew popular in Nicaragua. It is usually made from shredded corn and beef. The dish is traditional to Nicaragua and one of the most established. It is similar to a porridge. It dates at least to the colonial era and a mortar was used to prepare the dish.

References 

Nicaraguan cuisine
Meat stews
Maize dishes